Kristiansand Cathedral School  (Kristiansand katedralskole Gimle), known in Latin as Schola Christiansandensis, is a high school in Kristiansand, Agder, Norway. It is the oldest high school on the southern coast of Norway, having been founded in 1686. Originally, the school was located near the cathedral in the center of the town of Kristiansand. Although it represents an old institution, Katta is a modern school, offering courses in general and business studies, as well as in health and care. It has an exclusive collection of paintings donated by former student Reidar Wennesland, and some antique books.

Notable alumni
Mette-Marit Tjessem Høiby, Crown Princess of Norway (spouse of Crown Prince Haakon of Norway)
Jens Bjørneboe, painter and author
Bentein Baardson, actor and film director
Trygve Allister Diesen, writer and film director
Kristen Gislefoss, meteorologist 
Gaute Heivoll, author
Herman Smitt Ingebretsen, politician
Else Marie Jakobsen, designer and textile artist
Karl Ove Knausgård, author
Thomas Peter Krag, poet and author
Vilhelm Krag, author
Gabriel Langfeldt, psychiatrist
Jørgen Gunnarson Løvland, politician and editor
Andreas Munch, writer and author
Claus Pavels, priest and writer
Gabriel Scott, author
Sigmund Skard, professor in American literature
Andreas Thorkildsen, athlete (Olympic champion)
Kristoffer Ajer, professional football player

References

External links
Kristiansand katedralskole Gimle web site

Buildings and structures in Kristiansand
Cathedral schools
Education in Agder
Educational institutions established in the 1680s
Secondary schools in Norway
Vest-Agder County Municipality